Pinacolyl alcohol is a common name for 3,3-dimethylbutan-2-ol, also known as pine alcohol. It is one of the isomeric hexanols and a secondary alcohol.

Pinacolyl alcohol appears on the List of Schedule 2 substances (CWC) as a precursor for the nerve agent soman.

See also
Soman
Isopropyl alcohol

References

External links
 IPCS INTOX Databank

Hexanols
Nerve agent precursors
Secondary alcohols